William Guy (born 8 October 1967) is a Scottish professional golfer.

Guy completed his five-year PGA apprenticeship in 1991 at Buchanan Castle Golf Club and gained his European Tour Card in 1992.  Over the next five years he would compete on the main European Tour and the second tier Challenge Tour.  He finished tied 59th at the 1992 Open Championship and tied 66th at the 1993 Open Championship. Guy had several top-10 finishes, including the Kenya Open where he finished sixth.

References

External links

The Open.com: 1992 Open
The Open.com: 1993 Open

Scottish male golfers
European Tour golfers
People educated at Strathallan School
1967 births
Living people